The Act for the Advancement of True Religion (34 & 35 Henry VIII, c. 1) was an Act passed by the Parliament of England on 12 May 1543. It restricted the reading of the Bible to clerics, noblemen, the gentry and richer merchants. Women below gentry rank, servants, apprentices and generally poor people were forbidden to read it. Women of the gentry and the nobility were only allowed to read it in private.

The Act allowed moral plays to be performed if they promoted virtue and condemned vice but such plays were forbidden to contradict the interpretation of Scripture as set forth by the King.

The Act claims that "malicious minds have, intending to subvert the true exposition of Scripture, have taken upon them, by printed ballads, rhymes, etc., subtilly and craftily to instruct His Highness' people, and specially the youth of this his realm, untruly. For reformation whereof, His Majesty considereth it most requisite to purge his realm of all such books, ballads, rhymes, and songs, as be pestiferous and noisome". However, the Act also commanded that "all books printed before the year 1540, entituled Statutes, Chronicles, Canterbury Tales, Chaucer's books, Gower's books, and stories of men's lives, shall not be comprehended in the prohibition of this Act".

The Act was repealed under Henry's son, Edward VI (section 2 of the Act 1 Edward VI, c. 12).

References

William Chappell, Popular Music of the Olden Time a Collection of Ancient Songs, Ballads and Dance Tunes Illustrative of the National Music of England: Part One (Kessinger, 2004).
Janette Dillon, The Cambridge Introduction to Early English Theatre (Cambridge University Press, 2006).

1543 in law
1543 in England
Acts of the Parliament of England concerning religion
Christianity and law in the 16th century
1543 in Christianity